Phoenix Force may refer to:

 Phoenix Force (comics), a fictional entity in Marvel comic books
 Phoenix Force (novel), a series of action-adventure books published from 1982 to 1992

See also
 Phoenix (disambiguation)